The second season of Sex and the City, an American television romantic comedy-drama, aired in the United States on HBO from June 6 to October 3, 1999. Based on the eponymous book written by Candace Bushnell, the series was created by Darren Star and produced by Darren Star Productions, HBO Original Programming, and Warner Bros. Television. Star, Barry Josen and Michael Patrick King served as the series' executive producers. The show follows the relationships and sexual escapades of Carrie Bradshaw, a sex columnist for the fictional New York Star, and her friends Samantha Jones, Charlotte York and Miranda Hobbes.

Season two, comprising 18 episodes, aired on Sunday nights at 9:00 p.m. Eastern Time Zone. The season garnered a more positive reception from critics. The second season saw a rise in ratings from the previous season, averaging a total of nine million viewers. The show continued its award success in season two, garnering various major award nominations for the main cast and the series, including a Golden Globe Award win for Parker.

Episodes

Production
The second season of Sex and the City was created by Darren Star and produced by Darren Star Productions and Warner Bros. Television, in association with HBO Original Programming. The series is based on the book of the same name, written by Candace Bushnell, which contains stories from her column with the New York Observer. The show features production from Barry Jossen, Michael Patrick King, and Star. Season two featured writing credits from Star, King, Jenny Bicks, Cindy Chupack, Ollie Levy, and Terri Minsky. The season was directed by Alan Algrant, Allison Anders, John David Coles, Allan Coulter, Victoria Hochberg, Nicole Holofcener, Michael Spiller, and Alan Taylor.

Cast and characters

Season two featured four actors receiving star billing. Sarah Jessica Parker played the lead character Carrie Bradshaw, a writer of a sex column, "Sex and the City", for the fictional New York Star newspaper and the narrator of the series. Kim Cattrall portrayed Samantha Jones, a sexually confident public relations agent who follows the same relationship rules that men do. Kristin Davis played Charlotte York, an optimistic art museum curator who holds traditional views on relationships. Cynthia Nixon portrayed Miranda Hobbes, an acerbic lawyer with a pessimistic outlook on relationship and a distrust of men.

The season featured a number of recurring guest appearances. Chris Noth appeared as the slick, elusive business man and Carrie's love interest known as Mr. Big. Willie Garson portrayed Carrie's gay best friend and talent manager Stanford Blatch. David Eigenberg appears as bartender and Miranda's love interest Steve Brady. Ben Weber played Skipper Johnson, Carrie's friend and Miranda's on-off friend with benefits.

Reception

Critical reception
The second season averaged a total viewership of 9 million viewers, up from last season's average of 6.9 million.
Lloyd Paseman of Eugene Register-Guard gave the series a 4 star (out of 5) rating, praising the ensemble performance by the cast, the realistic nature of the characters and the writing. Terry Kelleher of People Weekly wrote a positive review, stating that the series is funnier in season two due to Miranda's choice in men. Kelleher then deemed it "The Man Show's smarter flip side."

Awards and nominations

At the 57th Golden Globe Awards, Sex and the City won the award for Best Television Series – Musical or Comedy while Sarah Jessica Parker won the award for Best Actress – Television Series Musical or Comedy. Kim Cattrall and Cynthia Nixon received nominations for Best Supporting Actress – Series, Miniseries or Television Film. Recurring cast member Chris Noth was also nominated for the Golden Globe Award for Best Supporting Actor – Series, Miniseries or Television Film. At the 2000 American Comedy Awards, Parker was nominated for Funniest Female Performer in a TV Series (Leading Role) Network, Cable or Syndication while Kristin Davis was nominated for Funniest Supporting Female Performer in a TV Series. Parker also received a nomination for the Screen Actors Guild Award for Outstanding Performance by a Female Actor in a Comedy Series. The series received a nomination for Best Television Series – Musical or Comedy at the 4th Golden Satellite Awards. 

At the Writers Guild of America Awards 1999, the series was nominated for the award for Television: Episodic Comedy with episodes "Ex and the City" and "Four Women and the Funeral". For "The Man, The Myth, The Viagra", Victoria Hochberg was nominated for the award for Outstanding Directing – Comedy Series at the 52nd Directors Guild of America Awards. Sex and the City received nominations for Program of the Year and TCA Award for Outstanding Achievement in Comedy at the 16th TCA Awards. At the 52nd Primetime Emmy Awards, the series was nominated for nine awards, including a second nomination for Outstanding Comedy Series and Outstanding Lead Actress in a Comedy Series for Parker. Cattrall also received her first nomination for Outstanding Supporting Actress in a Comedy Series while writers and executive producers Cindy Chupack and Michael Patrick King received nods for Outstanding Writing for a Comedy Series for their respective episodes.

Home media release

References

1999 American television seasons
Sex and the City